Lower Dock Hill Road Stone Arch Bridge is a historic stone arch bridge located at Cornwall on Hudson in Orange County, New York, United States.  It was built about 1850, and is constructed of locally quarried stone.

It was listed on the National Register of Historic Places in 2010.

References

Road bridges on the National Register of Historic Places in New York (state)
Bridges in Orange County, New York
National Register of Historic Places in Orange County, New York
Stone arch bridges in the United States